Targalla delatrix, the eugenia caterpillar, is a moth of the family Euteliidae. The species was first described by Achille Guenée in 1852. It is widespread in the Indo-Australian tropics to Fiji. It has also been recorded from Rapa Iti, the Society Islands and Hawaii.

Adults are brown with a subtle pattern on the forewings.

The larvae feed on Eugenia uniflora and Syzygium cumini (Myrtaceae). The larvae have a red-orange head, marked with clusters of yellow dots interveined with darker red. The body is translucent, greenish rose pink. The larva is sluggish, sitting outstretched on the undersides of young leaves of the host plant. Pupation takes place in the surface of the soil in a strong cocoon which incorporates leaf litter.

References

External links

Euteliinae
Moths of Japan